At the Old Stage Door is a 1919 American short comedy film featuring Harold Lloyd. A print of the film survives in the Museum of Modern Art.

Cast
 Harold Lloyd
 Snub Pollard
 Bebe Daniels
 Sammy Brooks
 Lew Harvey
 Gus Leonard
 James Parrott
 Al St. John
 Dorothea Wolbert
 Noah Young

See also
 List of American films of 1919
 Harold Lloyd filmography

References

External links

1919 films
1919 short films
1919 comedy films
Silent American comedy films
American silent short films
American black-and-white films
Films directed by Hal Roach
American comedy short films
1910s American films
1910s English-language films